Poynton High School is a coeducational secondary school and sixth form located in Poynton, Cheshire, just outside Greater Manchester. The school was maintained by the Cheshire East Local Education Authority until December 2018 when it converted and became a founder member of the True Learning Partnership. The school was opened in 1972, and was awarded Arts College status in 2002. It has 1,421 pupils between Years 7 and 13 (ages 11–18). This includes a sixth form of 285 pupils.

Description
The school serves the communities of Poynton, Disley, Adlington, Pott Shrigley and further afield out towards Macclesfield and Stockport. This is a relatively advantaged area where a high proportion of adults have received higher education.
The proportion of students entitled to free school meals is small.  The number of students with learning difficulties or disabilities is well below the national average.  The number of students whose first language is not English is well below the national average.

Ofsted have rated the school as 'Good' in December 2015.  Poynton High School was previously ranked the best state school in Cheshire East Local Education Authority in 2012, and was rated as an 'outstanding school' by Ofsted at the previous inspections in October 2008.

The school was a maintained school until December 2018, Poynton High School and Lostock Hall Primary School became the founding partners of The TRUE Learning Partnership.

Academics
Students remain the same tutor group from year 7 until the end of the sixth form in year 13. Year 7 students focus on balancing their wide ranging academic National Curriculum studies with a great number of extra-curricular opportunities. In Years 8 and 9 students work towards achieving a “Cultural Passport”, demonstrating the wider knowledge and understanding needed in the world.

Alongside GCSEs, in Years 9, 10 and 11, students are supported in learning about personal finance, careers and enterprise opportunities and how to revise and prepare for external examinations effectively. A percentage of student achieve the prestigious EBacc.
Most students opt to continue their studies in the sixth form, which prepares students for Oxbridge and Russell Group universities,  apprenticeships or employment in diverse fields.

Extra curricular activities
Students are expected to be involved in the wider school life. This is encouraged through a house and house point system. There are the traditional sports clubs, and performance groups. Poynton enters teams at district, county and national level events. PE staff coach over 20 sports teams. There are opportunities to be involved in the Duke of Edinburgh Award Scheme and trips and visits: ski trip, individual subject trips and field courses, modern foreign language exchanges, Camps International trips and performing arts tours.

The site
With a sports hall, gymnasium, swimming pool, tennis courts, squash courts, outdoor gym and mile track and football and rugby pitches, Poynton High is well equipped for team sports, fitness and wellbeing. The school has a purpose built dance studio, a hall theatre and drama studios. As a performing arts school it has the facilities to teach both the performance side and the technical back stage operations. There is a separate sixth form centre, and a Emotional Health and Wellbeing Centre, with state of the art medical room, to give access to CAMHS workers, first aid officers and intervention managers

Notable former pupils

Film and media
David Bowers, film director
Ian Clark, film director
Anouska Golebiewski, Big Brother (UK) contestant
Matt Nixson, journalist, former head of features for The Sun newspaper
Sam Yates, theatre director

Politicians
Graham Evans, Baron Evans of Rainow, former Conservative Party Member of Parliament (MP) for Weaver Vale from 2010-2017 Member of the House of Lords since 2022.
Andrew Stephenson, Chairman of the Conservative Party, Privy Councillor and Conservative Party MP for Pendle, and Minister without Portfolio
William Wragg, Conservative Party MP for Hazel Grove

Sports
Dame Sarah Storey, road and track cyclist, and Paralympic Games gold medallist
Sophie Thornhill, track cyclist
Daniel Pepper, Paralympic swimmer, double IPC world champion

Notable former staff members 
Jane Brooke, residentiary canon chancellor of Chester Cathedral
Patsy Calton, former Liberal Democrat MP for Cheadle

References

External links

Secondary schools in the Borough of Cheshire East
Academies in the Borough of Cheshire East
Poynton